

Heinrich Götz (1 January 1896 – 31 January 1960) was a German general during World War II. He was a recipient of the Knight's Cross of the Iron Cross with Oak Leaves of Nazi Germany.

Awards and decorations 
 Iron Cross (1914) 2nd Class (25 October 1915) & 1st Class (19 March 1917)
 Clasp to the Iron Cross (1939)  2nd Class (30 September 1939) & 1st Class (6 October 1939)
 Knight's Cross of the Iron Cross with Oak Leaves
 Knight's Cross on 3 May 1942 as Oberstleutnant and commander of Infanterie-Regiment 466
 623rd Oak Leaves on 5 March 1945 as Generalmajor and commander of 21. Infanterie-Division

References

Citations

Bibliography

 
 

1896 births
1960 deaths
Lieutenant generals of the German Army (Wehrmacht)
German Army personnel of World War I
Recipients of the clasp to the Iron Cross, 1st class
Recipients of the Knight's Cross of the Iron Cross with Oak Leaves
Military personnel from Hanover
German prisoners of war in World War II
People from the Province of Hanover